Fallaj Khuzam Al-Shanar (born October 10, 1947) is a retired Saudi football referee. He is known for having refereed one match in the 1986 FIFA World Cup in Mexico.

References

External links
Profile

1947 births
Saudi Arabian football referees
FIFA World Cup referees
Living people
1986 FIFA World Cup referees